Illela, Niger is a town and urban commune in Niger.

References

 La Commune urbaine d'Illéla dans la région de Tahoua : une solide organisation sociale traditionnelle.  Dubois Touraoua, ONEP Tahoua-Agadez, Le Sahel, 2011-07-07.
 Illéla veut dire «Venir pour s'épanouir».  Dubois Touraoua, ONEP Tahoua-Agadez, Le Sahel, 2011-07-07.

Communes of Niger